Joshua Winslow Groban (born February 27, 1981) is an American singer, songwriter, and actor. His first four solo albums have been certified multi-platinum, and he was charted in 2007 as the number-one best selling artist in the United States, with over 22.3 million records. , he had sold over 25 million records worldwide.

Groban originally studied acting, but moved to singing as his voice developed. He attended the Los Angeles County High School for the Arts, a free public school on the campus of California State University, Los Angeles, where students receive a conservatory-style education. David Foster called him to stand in for an ailing Andrea Bocelli to rehearse a duet, "The Prayer", with Celine Dion at the rehearsal for the 1998 Grammy Awards. Rosie O'Donnell immediately invited him to appear on her talk show. Foster asked him to sing at California Governor Gray Davis' 1999 inauguration. He was cast on Ally McBeal by the show's creator, David E. Kelley, performing "You're Still You", later released on his debut album, for the 2001 season four finale.

After his appearance in two professional productions of the musical Chess, he made his Broadway debut in 2016 as Pierre Bezukhov in Natasha, Pierre & The Great Comet of 1812, to critical acclaim and nomination for a 2017 Tony Award for Best Actor in a Leading Role in a Musical. His performance at the 72nd Tony Awards earned him two Primetime Emmy nominations, one for Outstanding Live Variety Special and one for Original Music and Lyrics for the song "This One's for You". Groban co-starred as Tony Caruso Jr. in the Netflix original series, The Good Cop. Groban was also the host of Rising Star, he also appeared in the films, Coffee Town, Muppets Most Wanted, The Hollars and Crazy, Stupid, Love. He also appeared on TV such as Danny Chase in The Crazy Ones, as well as Walter Bernard Jr. in The Office.

Early life and education 
Groban was born in Los Angeles, California, to Jack Groban, a businessman, and Lindy Groban (née Johnston), a school teacher. His father is a descendant of Jewish immigrants from Poland and Ukraine, but converted from Judaism to Christianity upon marrying his mother. His mother's ancestry includes English, German, and Norwegian url=https://www.usatoday.com/life/movies/movieawards/sundance/2008-01-20-sundance-concert_N.htm | work=USA Today | title=Josh Groban to sing at Sundance festival | date=January 21, 2008 | access-date=May 7, 2010 | first=Michael | last=Cidoni}}</ref> His parents are Episcopalians.

Groban first sang in public when he was in the seventh grade. His music teacher chose him to sing a solo of "S'wonderful" at the school's cabaret night, where he sang alone on stage for the first time. At this time, he was more focused on acting, playing Tevye in his high school's production of Fiddler on the Roof. In the summers of 1997 and 1998, he also attended the Interlochen Center for the Arts Camp in Michigan, majoring in musical theater, and began taking vocal lessons. He went on to attend the Los Angeles County High School for the Arts as a theater major and graduated in 1999. He was admitted to and briefly attended Carnegie Mellon University, intent on studying musical theater. Four months into his first semester, Groban was offered a recording contract and left college to pursue a singing career.

Career

1997–2001: Debut 
In late 1997, the 16-year-old Groban was introduced by his vocal coach, Seth Riggs, to Grammy-winning producer and arranger David Foster and future manager Brian Avnet. At the time, Groban had no recording experience and was preparing for his studies at Carnegie Mellon. Groban worked for David Foster as a rehearsal singer on a series of high-profile events, including the January 1999 California gubernatorial inauguration of Gray Davis and the 1999 Grammy Awards where—as a stand-in for Andrea Bocelli—he rehearsed Foster's "The Prayer" with Céline Dion. According to Avnet, Groban was very nervous about standing in for Bocelli and had to be talked into it; his performance prompted the show hostess, Rosie O'Donnell, to ask him to appear on her show the following week, which in turn led to an appearance on Ally McBeal. Creator David E. Kelley wrote the character Malcolm Wyatt for Groban in the season finale, aired in May 2001. His performance, including the song "You're Still You", was so popular that the show received upwards of 8,000 emails from viewers. The song was included on his eponymous debut album, released in November 2001. Groban was asked to return the next season to reprise his role as Wyatt, performing "To Where You Are", airing just two weeks after his debut album was released. Avnet claims this sequence of events effectively got Groban's career off the ground.

Groban was offered a recording contract at Warner Bros. Records through Foster's 143 Records imprint. Avnet told HitQuarters that Warner Bros. initially proved resistant to the deal because "They were afraid they wouldn't be able to get a voice like that on radio." Explaining his reasons for signing the artist, Foster said: "I love his natural ability in the pop and rock arena, but I love his sense of classics even more. He's a true musical force to be reckoned with." Under Foster's influence, Groban's first album focused more on classics such as "Gira Con Me Questa Notte" and "Alla Luce Del Sole".

Groban performed "There For Me" with Sarah Brightman on her 2000–01 La Luna World Tour, and was featured on her "La Luna" concert DVD. He recorded "For Always" with Lara Fabian for the movie soundtrack of A.I. Artificial Intelligence (2001). Groban performed in many benefit shows, including "The Andre Agassi Grand Slam Event For Children," alongside Elton John, Stevie Wonder, Don Henley, and Robin Williams; "Muhammad Ali's Fight Night Foundation" which honored Michael J. Fox and others; "The Family Celebration" (2001), which was co-hosted by President Bill Clinton and Hillary Clinton, and David E. Kelley and Michelle Pfeiffer; and Michael Milken's CapCure event, which raised funds for cancer research.

His self-titled debut album Josh Groban was released on November 20, 2001. Over the next year it went from gold to double-platinum.

2002–2005: Closer 

On February 24, 2002, Groban performed "The Prayer" with Charlotte Church at the closing ceremonies of the Winter Olympics in Salt Lake City, and by November, he had his own PBS special titled "Josh Groban In Concert" (2002). In December 2002, he performed "To Where You Are" and sang "The Prayer" in a duet with Sissel Kyrkjebø at the Nobel Peace Prize Concert in Oslo, Norway. He joined The Corrs, Ronan Keating, Sting, Lionel Richie, and others for a Christmas performance at the Vatican. In 2003, Groban performed at the David Foster concert for World Children's Day, singing "The Prayer" with Celine Dion and the finale song, "Aren't They All Our Children?" with artists including Yolanda Adams, Nick Carter, Enrique Iglesias, and Celine Dion.

Groban's second album Closer, produced and written by Foster, was released on November 11, 2003. Groban said he believed that this album was a better reflection of him, and his audience would be able to get a better idea of his personality from listening to it.

Two months after Closer was released, it rose on the Billboard charts from number 11 to number one. Groban's cover of "You Raise Me Up" became his third most popular song on the adult contemporary charts as of March 2004. Later that year, he also performed the song "Remember" (with Tanja Tzarovska) on the Troy soundtrack, "Believe" on the soundtrack to the 2004 animated film The Polar Express and a cover of Linkin Park's "My December".

In the summer of 2004, Groban returned to Interlochen, performing and discussing his earlier experiences with local residents and campers. On November 30, 2004, his second live DVD, Live At The Greek, was released; it was also shown as a Great Performances special on PBS. That same year, Groban performed "Remember When It Rained", backed by a full orchestra, at the American Music Awards, where he was nominated for Favorite Male Artist in the pop category; he was also nominated for a People's Choice Award. His recording of "Believe" secured an Academy Award nomination in 2005 for the songwriters Glen Ballard and Alan Silvestri, and earned them a Grammy in the category Best Song Written for a Motion Picture, Television or Other Visual Media at the ceremony held in February 2006.

2005–2010: Awake 
Groban earned his first Grammy nomination in 2005 for his single "You Raise Me Up" in the Best Male Pop Vocal Performance category. During the first week of September 2006, Groban's single entitled "You Are Loved (Don't Give Up)" was released exclusively on AOL's First Listen. His third studio album Awake was officially released on November 7, 2006. Groban performed "You Are Loved (Don't Give Up)" as well as two other tracks from Awake at his recording session for Live from Abbey Road at Abbey Road Studios on October 26, 2006. On that album, Groban also collaborated on the single "Now or Never" with British musician and songwriter Imogen Heap. He performed two tracks with the South African group Ladysmith Black Mambazo, "Lullaby" and "Weeping".  Groban's "Awake" world tour visited 71 cities between February and August 2007, and toured Australia and the Philippines with Lani Misalucha as his special guest in October 2007. He performed a duet with Barbra Streisand ("All I Know of Love") and with Mireille Mathieu ("Over the Rainbow"). As to his future, Groban was open to a plethora of possibilities. He said, "I am fortunate enough to have had many really big moments in my career. I think the mistake a lot of people in my position make is to always search for the next big thing. I am looking forward to playing some small theaters. I'm looking forward to writing more. I want to delve further into my acting career and explore some of the film and TV opportunities that I haven't had time for. My outlook is to expect the unexpected. And when the next step comes, I'm prepared to take it."

2010–2015: Illuminations; All That Echoes 
Groban finished his fifth studio album, entitled Illuminations, and the album was released on November 15, 2010. Most of the songs on the album are about "specific situations that I've had where love has existed and ultimately failed," Groban told The New York Times, adding: "And other songs are about the quest, and it just not working out." Groban wrote 11 of the 13 songs on the album. The first single from the album, "Hidden Away", was made available for free download via Facebook on September 8. "For me to sit in a room with a piano in one take with some of Johnny Cash's musicians—that was totally new for me." Josh added. "and I think that excitement is on the record." On October 12, a second single from the upcoming album, "Você Existe Em Mim", was made available on iTunes. This song is sung in Portuguese and was written by Brazilian artist Carlinhos Brown. The Washington Post said: "Illuminations" is not a revelation, but it offers a perfectly fine, and often quite lovely, glimpse at a pop-classical crossover artist in the middle of crossing over." Groban plans on making one more record with Rick Rubin. Beginning May 12, 2011, and continuing through December of that year, Groban undertook the 81-city Straight to You Tour to promote Illuminations, encompassing appearances in North America, Europe, and South Africa.

Groban's sixth studio album, All That Echoes, was released on February 5, 2013, debuting at number one by selling 141,000 copies. Groban promoted the album with the All That Echoes World Tour in 2013. A year later, he embarked on his Summer Symphony Tour.

2015–2017: Stages and Broadway debut 
In early March 2015, Josh Groban's Facebook page announced the release of the album Stages, consisting of covers of songs from Broadway musicals. The album was released on April 28, 2015.

Starting October 18, 2016, Groban performed on Broadway as Pierre Bezukhov in Natasha, Pierre & The Great Comet of 1812, an electropop opera by composer Dave Malloy based on War and Peace. For his performance as Pierre, Groban was nominated for the 2017 Tony Award for Best Actor in a Leading Role in a Musical. His final performance as Pierre was on July 2, 2017. Groban also performed the song "Evermore" during the end credits of the 2017 Disney film Beauty and the Beast.

2018: Bridges 
On March 12, 2018, tour dates were announced for Groban's Bridges Tour with special guest Idina Menzel. The US leg of the tour began on October 18, 2018, in Duluth, Georgia and concluded at Madison Square Garden in New York City on November 18. The European leg of the tour began on December 12 at the O2 Arena in London and concluded on December 18 in Poland.

On June 26, 2018, Groban announced via social media that his album Bridges would be released on September 21 and would contain a cover of Céline Dion's song "S'il suffisait d'aimer" along with new tracks. The album debuted at number two in the US and in the top 10 in the UK and Scotland.

2022: Return to Broadway 
On August 24, 2022, it was announced that Groban would return to Broadway in an upcoming revival of Sweeney Todd. He will star opposite Tony Award winner Annaleigh Ashford. The production is set to begin previews February 26, 2023 and officially open on March 26, 2023 at the Lunt-Fontanne Theatre.

Performances 

In June 2007, Groban recorded a Christmas album in London with the London Symphony Orchestra and the Magdalen College Choir. Titled Noël, it was released on October 9, 2007. The album saw great success in the United States, breaking numerous records for a Christmas album and becoming the best-selling album of 2007 in only its tenth week of release, at sales of 3.6 million.  He discussed it on the DVD from "The Making of Noël".

On July 1, 2007, Groban performed with Sarah Brightman at the Concert for Diana at Wembley Stadium; it was broadcast to over 500 million homes in 140 countries. On February 10, 2008, Groban performed at the 2008 Grammy Awards with Andrea Bocelli in a tribute to Luciano Pavarotti.

On April 14, 2008, Groban joined Idina Menzel for a PBS Soundstage taping. The next day, he held his own taping for the same PBS TV series at Lincoln Center's Rose Hall at Jazz in Manhattan.

On May 12 and 13, 2008, at Royal Albert Hall, London,  Groban performed as "The Russian" Anatoly Sergievsky with Broadway stars Idina Menzel and Adam Pascal in "Chess in Concert" a live concert version of the musical Chess composed by Benny Andersson and Björn Ulvaeus of ABBA fame. This performance has since been made into a DVD and CD recording.

On September 21, 2008, Groban performed a comical medley of well-known TV theme songs at the 60th Annual Primetime Emmy Awards. In December 2008, Groban appeared on Never Mind the Buzzcocks. He performed a duet with Only Men Aloud! at the Royal Variety Show at the London Palladium for the Prince of Wales and Duchess of Cornwall.

On January 18, 2009, Groban performed as part of the Presidential Inauguration ceremonies, performing "My Country 'Tis of Thee" in duet with Heather Headley. On January 19, 2009, Groban performed with Herbie Hancock as part of Feeding America's Rally Against Hunger in Washington DC. At the 2010 BCS National Championship Game, he performed the Star Spangled Banner on January 7, 2010, with Red Hot Chili Peppers bassist Flea at the historic Rose Bowl in Pasadena, California.

Film and television appearances 
Groban has appeared on The Oprah Winfrey Show six times, as well as on The Ellen DeGeneres Show, Larry King Live, The Rosie O'Donnell Show, Tim and Eric Awesome Show, Great Job!, Comedy Bang! Bang!, The Tonight Show with Jay Leno, 20/20, Today, Macy's Thanksgiving Day Parade, Super Bowl XXXVIII, and Jimmy Kimmel Live!. He has also been a guest co-host on Live with Kelly many times from 2011 to 2016, and was a finalist to permanently replace Regis Philbin. In a 2012 interview, Groban said:

Groban plays Malcolm Wyatt, one of Reverend Harris' choirboys, on Ally McBeal, episodes "The Wedding" and "Nine One One" (2001). He has made two guest appearances on the series Glee as himself.

Groban appeared on BBC Two's hit British music quiz Never Mind the Buzzcocks, and his first appearance was as a guest on Omid Djalili's team. On December 21, 2010, he returned to the show, this time as guest host/quiz master and ending the show duetting with Michael Ball in a version of "I Dreamed a Dream" from Les Misérables.

Groban appears in two episodes of The Office as Andy Bernard's brother ("Garden Party" and "The Boat").

On May 24, 2011, Groban appeared as a mystery guest star on the season 12 finale of Dancing with the Stars to surprise Petra Němcová by singing "You Raise Me Up" to her dance. When she saw that it was he who was actually singing and not one of the usual performers, she momentarily was too stunned to continue dancing.

In the comedy Crazy, Stupid, Love, a film starring Steve Carell and Ryan Gosling, released on July 29, 2011, Groban played a character named Richard, a caddish and nerdy attorney and the previous love interest of Hannah, who's played by Emma Stone.

In 2012, he appeared in episode 5 of series 12 of the revived British comedy panel show Room 101. In October the same year, his cover of "You Raise Me Up" was used in the Halloween-based teen comedy film, Fun Size, in which Peng turns on the car stereo in Roosevelt's car and while he and Roosevelt are fighting over it, the knob breaks and the stereo blares the song at full volume, thus making Roosevelt, Wren, Peng and April uncool as they roll onto a night-cruising street. In February 2013, Groban appeared in CSI: NYs "Blood Actually" (season 9, episode 16), performing his new song "Happy In My Heartache", and guest anchored on Canada AM.

Also in 2013, he played one of the lead characters named Sam in the independent comedy film Coffee Town, produced by CollegeHumor and co-starring with longtime friend and actor Glenn Howerton.

Groban appeared on the cable television comedy series It's Always Sunny in Philadelphia in episode "The Gang Saves the Day", the 100th of the series, also co-starring Howerton. He shows up in the character Dee's fantasy sequence. On November 7, 2013, he made the first of several appearances in the CBS comedy The Crazy Ones alongside Robin Williams and Sarah Michelle Gellar.

Groban appeared in the 2014 film Muppets Most Wanted as an unnamed prisoner in a maximum security prison in Siberia. Groban's character is first only heard, as he is in a large metal box with a small slot at around eye level. The actor is revealed in the musical number "Together Again" later at the end of the film.

He appeared in cameo roles in the seventh season of Parks and Recreation (2015) and in Crazy Ex-Girlfriend (as himself); in the latter, he sang the original song "The End of the Movie".

In September 2018 Netflix premiered an original murder-mystery, The Good Cop, starring Groban. In the series, created by Monk creator-writer Andy Breckman, Groban portrays NYPD homicide detective Tony Caruso Jr., opposite Tony Danza, who plays his father, Tony Sr., a disgraced former detective. The first season of ten episodes launched on September 21, 2018.

In early 2022, Groban made a guest appearance on the Jimmy Fallon hosted NBC game-show, That's My Jam. Groban was partnered with fellow artist, Alessia Cara. The duo was defeated by the competing team made up of Joseph Gordon-Levitt and Chance the Rapper. Groban played the role of Beast in the 2022 musical television special Beauty and the Beast Live!.

Voice 
Various music critics have described Groban's voice in different ways, with some referring to him as a tenor and others as a baritone. In performance, Groban's music goes as low as G2 (as in the songs "To Where You Are", "Higher Window", and "The World We Knew (Over and Over)") and extends up to at least B4 (as heard in "The Duel" from Natasha, Pierre & The Great Comet of 1812). This places his voice lower than the usual tenor range on the low end (although still within the vocal fry register of a tenor), and just short of tenor C, and therefore above the baritone range, on the high end.

There is no authoritative system of voice classification in non-classical music. The problem lies in the fact that classical terms are used to describe not merely various vocal ranges, but specific vocal timbres each unique to those respective ranges, and produced by the classical training techniques with which most popular singers are not intimately familiar and which are not universally employed by the few that are. In a 2002 New York Times article, Groban described himself as a "tenor in training". He mentioned during his appearance on Late Show with David Letterman in December 2013 that he is a high lyric baritone. On Twitter, in March 2012, he had also mentioned that he is a baritone "with some high notes up my sleeve."

Philanthropy 

Under the guidance of his mentor David Foster, Groban performed for many charity events that included VH1 Save the Music Foundation (2005), Tsunami Aid: A Concert of Hope (2005), Fifth Annual Adopt-A-Minefield concert (2005), 2nd Annual Grammy Jam (2005), Live 8 (2005), The Heart Foundation Gala (2005), and David Foster and Friends Charity Gala (2006). He also sang a solo on the recording of We Are The World 25 for Haiti (2010). Inspired by a visit with Nelson Mandela during a 2004 trip to South Africa, he established the Josh Groban Foundation to help children in need through education, healthcare and the arts. Mandela appointed Groban as an Official Ambassador for Mandela's Project 46664, a campaign to help raise Global awareness of HIV/AIDS in Africa. On April 25, 2007, Groban performed with the African Children's Choir on American Idols "Idol Gives Back" episode. Also on September 2, 2007, Groban donated $150,000 to Charlotte-Mecklenburg Schools to fund music education.

On February 28, 2008, he appeared in One Night Live at the Air Canada Centre in Toronto, Canada with Bryan Adams, Sarah McLachlan, Jann Arden and RyanDan in aid of the Sunnybrook Hospital Women and Babies Program. In honor of his 27th birthday, his fans set out to raise $27,000 in a project called "Raise 27". They ended up raising a total of $44,227 for the Josh Groban Foundation, to benefit the Noah's Ark children's orphanage called Siyawela in South Africa. Groban has since referred to this donation as "the best birthday present ever". Groban performed at The Angel Ball on October 21, 2010, to benefit the Gabrielles Angel Foundation for cancer research. In April 2013 and the previous year, Groban took part in Global Poverty Project's "Live Below the Line" campaign, which consists in living on $1.50 a day to raise awareness of extreme poverty around the world. He also wrote a song inspired by the campaign.

On October 30, 2013, Groban met with Little Kids Rock students in Newark, New Jersey before his concert at the Prudential Center. His Find Your Light Foundation also made a donation to Little Kids Rock to support their mission of keeping music education in our public schools. An active arts education philanthropist and advocate, Groban is a member of Americans for the Arts Artists Committee.

On January 17, 2021, three days before the Inauguration of Joe Biden Groban performed at an "indoguration" for Joe Biden's Major organized by the Delaware Humane Association more than 7,400 people attended via Zoom and the event also raised $200,000 in donations for the association.

 Impact 
Some of Groban's musical influences have been Radiohead, Steve Perry, Paul Simon, Sting, Peter Gabriel, Freddie Mercury and Björk. He cites as vocal influences "anyone who told a story with their songs," including Mandy Patinkin, Klaus Nomi, George Hearn, and Luciano Pavarotti.

Groban has sold more than 20 million albums in less than ten years. In 2002, Groban was listed as "100 Sexiest Newcomer" and in 2008, he became one of Peoples "100 Most Beautiful People".

 Discography 

Studio albums
 Josh Groban (2001)
 Closer (2003)
 Awake (2006)
 Noël (2007)
 Illuminations (2010)
 All That Echoes (2013)
 Stages (2015)
 Bridges (2018)
 Harmony (2020)

 Concert tours HeadliningCloser Tour 
Awake Tour 
Straight to You Tour 
All That Echoes World Tour 
Josh Groban on Stage 
Bridges Tour 
 Harmony Tour SymphonicAll That Echoes Symphony Tour 
Summer Symphony Tour PromotionalBefore We Begin Residencies'
Josh's Great Big Radio City Show

Personal life 
Groban dated actresses January Jones from 2003 to 2006 and Kat Dennings from 2014 to 2016. Groban has been dating actress and writer Schuyler Helford since 2017.

Acting credits

Film

Television

Theatre

Accolades

Music

Television

Theatre

References

External links 

 
 
 
 
 

 
1981 births
Living people
21st-century American Episcopalians
21st-century American male actors
21st-century American male musicians
21st-century American singers
American gospel singers
American male film actors
American male musical theatre actors
American male pianists
American male stage actors
American male television actors
American people of English descent
American people of German descent
American people of Norwegian descent
American people of Polish-Jewish descent
American people of Ukrainian-Jewish descent
American pop pianists
American pop rock singers
American soft rock musicians
Ballad musicians
Carnegie Mellon University College of Fine Arts alumni
Christians from California
French-language singers of the United States
Italian-language singers
Latin-language singers
Los Angeles County High School for the Arts alumni
Male actors from Los Angeles
Musicians from Los Angeles
Opera crossover singers
Philanthropists from California
Reprise Records artists
Singers from California
Songwriters from California
Theatre World Award winners